Teng Wei (born May 21, 1974 in Changchun, Jilin) is a female Chinese football (soccer) player who competed at the 2004 Summer Olympics.

In 2004, she finished ninth with the Chinese team in the women's tournament. She played both matches.

International goals

External links
profile

1974 births
Living people
Chinese women's footballers
China women's international footballers
Footballers at the 2004 Summer Olympics
Olympic footballers of China
2003 FIFA Women's World Cup players
Footballers from Changchun
Women's association footballers not categorized by position